Otangarei is a suburb of Whangārei, in Northland Region, New Zealand.

The New Zealand Ministry for Culture and Heritage gives a translation of "place of [a] group of people leaping" for Ōtāngarei.

Te Kotahitanga Marae o Otangarei is the community's local marae. It is a meeting ground for the Ngāpuhi hapū of Uri o Te Tangata, and features Te Puawaitanga Hou meeting house.

Demographics

Otangarei had a population of 2,109 at the 2018 New Zealand census, an increase of 474 people (29.0%) since the 2013 census, and a decrease of 30 people (−1.4%) since the 2006 census. There were 585 households, comprising 1,071 males and 1,044 females, giving a sex ratio of 1.03 males per female. The median age was 28.9 years (compared with 37.4 years nationally), with 624 people (29.6%) aged under 15 years, 465 (22.0%) aged 15 to 29, 813 (38.5%) aged 30 to 64, and 210 (10.0%) aged 65 or older.

Ethnicities were 30.2% European/Pākehā, 78.4% Māori, 11.1% Pacific peoples, 1.7% Asian, and 1.0% other ethnicities. People may identify with more than one ethnicity.

The percentage of people born overseas was 5.7, compared with 27.1% nationally.

Although some people chose not to answer the census's question about religious affiliation, 44.4% had no religion, 32.6% were Christian, 14.5% had Māori religious beliefs, 0.1% were Hindu, 0.4% were Muslim, 0.1% were Buddhist and 0.9% had other religions.

Of those at least 15 years old, 57 (3.8%) people had a bachelor's or higher degree, and 462 (31.1%) people had no formal qualifications. The median income was $17,400, compared with $31,800 nationally. 30 people (2.0%) earned over $70,000 compared to 17.2% nationally. The employment status of those at least 15 was that 435 (29.3%) people were employed full-time, 189 (12.7%) were part-time, and 177 (11.9%) were unemployed.

Education 
Te Kura o Otangarei is a coeducational full primary (years 1-8) school with a decile rating of 1 and  students as of  It opened in 1955 as Otangarei Primary School and opened its full immersion Māori language unit in 1996. It expanded to include year 7 and 8 students in 2004, and adopted its current name in 2006. The school offers a choice between full immersion Māori language classes, bilingual classes or mainstream education.

As of 2018, there are also adult education classes in Te Reo Māori, Tikanga Marae and Waiata on a weekly basis for both the Otangarei and wider communities held at Te Puawaitanga Marae by Shaquille Shortland.

Sport

Rugby 
City RFC are based in Otangarei, Whangārei and play in the Northland Rugby Union South Zone competitions.
The club colours are blue & white hoops.

Rugby league 
City Knights (formerly Kensington Knights) are based in Otangarei, Whangarei and play in the Whangarei City & Districts rugby league competitions.

Notes

Populated places in the Northland Region
Suburbs of Whangārei